Frederick Burkhardt (13 September 1913 – 23 September 2007) was an American educator and foundation administrator. He was President of the American Council of Learned Societies (ACLS), then after his retirement devoted decades of work on The Correspondence of Charles Darwin. 

He was an Honorary Fellow of Clare Hall, Cambridge. Dr. Burkhardt served as President of Bennington College in Vermont from 1947 to 1949 and from 1952 to 1957.

Burkhardt graduated from Columbia University with a B.A. in 1933 and a Ph.D. in 1940. He also earned a second bachelor's degree from the University of Oxford in 1935.

Burkhardt died on September 23, 2007, in Bennington, Vermont.

References 

1913 births
2007 deaths
Fellows of Clare Hall, Cambridge
Charles Darwin biographers
Columbia College (New York) alumni
Presidents of Bennington College
Columbia Graduate School of Arts and Sciences alumni
Presidents of the American Council of Learned Societies